Qarha is a village located in the Baalbek District of the Baalbek-Hermel Governorate in Lebanon.

References

Populated places in Baalbek District